Revtraviricetes is a class of viruses that contains all viruses that encode a reverse transcriptase. The group includes all ssRNA-RT viruses (including the retroviruses) and dsDNA-RT viruses. It is the sole class in the phylum Artverviricota, which is the sole phylum in the kingdom Pararnavirae. The name of the group is a portmanteau of "reverse transcriptase" and -viricetes which is the suffix for a virus class.

Orders
The following orders are recognized:

 Blubervirales (e.g. hepatitis B virus)
 Ortervirales (retroviruses, Caulimoviridae and various LTR retrotransposons)

References

Viruses
Virus classes